Australia women's cricket team toured Sri Lanka in September 2016. The tour consisted of a series of four One Day Internationals (ODIs) and one Twenty20 International (T20I). Three of the four WODIs were part of the ongoing 2014–16 ICC Women's Championship. Australia won the ODI series 4–0 and the one-off T20I match by 10 wickets. Australia's margin of victory in the T20I was the largest, by balls remaining, in a women's fixture.

Squads

ODI series

1st ODI

2nd ODI

3rd ODI

4th ODI

T20I Series

Only T20I

References

External links
 Series Home on ESPNcricinfo

International cricket competitions in 2016–17
Aus 2016
2014–16 ICC Women's Championship
Sri 2016
2016 in Sri Lankan cricket
2016–17 Australian women's cricket season
2016 in women's cricket